The Discovery of Global Warming is a book by physicist and historian Spencer R. Weart published in 2003; revised and updated edition, 2008.  It traces the history of scientific discoveries that led to the current scientific opinion on climate change. It has been translated into Spanish, Japanese, Italian, Arabic, Chinese and Korean.

Reviews

See also
History of climate change science

External links 
Online expanded and updated version of The Discovery of Global Warming

2003 non-fiction books
2003 in the environment
2008 in the environment
21st-century history books
History books about scientific discoveries
Harvard University Press books
Climate change books